Georg Stiernhielm (August 7, 1598 – April 22, 1672) was a Swedish civil servant, mathematician, linguist and poet.

Life
Stiernhielm was born on the family estate Gammelgården in the village Svartskär in Vika parish in Dalarna where his father, Olof Markvardsson, of the noble mining family Stierna, was a miner and bailiff. The surname Stiernhielm, literally "Star Helmet", was taken in later life when he was raised into the Swedish nobility. He grew up in the Bergslagen region where his father worked with the mining industry. Stiernhielm received his first schooling at Västerås, but he was also educated in Germany and the Netherlands.

In 1636 he obtained the Vasula manor near Tartu, Estonia and lived there until 1656, when he moved due to war with Russia back to Stockholm. He was elected a Fellow of the Royal Society of London in December 1669.

Works
He was a pioneer of linguistics, and even if many of his conclusions later proved wrong they were accepted by his contemporaries. Stiernhielm tried to prove that Gothic, which he equated with Old Norse was the origin of all languages, and that the Nordic countries were vagina gentium, the human birthplace.

His most famous work is "Hercules", an epic poem in hexameter, about how Hercules in his youth is being tempted by Fru Lusta ("Mrs. Lust") and her daughters to choose an immoral lifestyle for his future. The allegory, known as Hercules at the crossroads, can be traced back to the Athenian sophist Prodicus of Ceos, as preserved in Xenophon.

Stiernhielm was the first Swedish poet to apply the verse meters of antique poets to the Swedish language, modifying their principle of long and short syllables to a principle of stressed and unstressed syllables, which better suits the phonology of Swedish, using ideas first developed by Martin Opitz and later theoretically applied to Swedish by Andreas Arvidi. This made him known as "the father of Swedish poetry". His Musæ Suethizantes of 1668 is held to be the first important Swedish book of poetry.

References

External links

 

1598 births
1672 deaths
People from Falun
17th-century Swedish writers
17th-century male writers
Swedish nobility
Swedish-language writers
Uppsala University alumni
University of Greifswald alumni
Fellows of the Royal Society
Christina, Queen of Sweden